Abi Branning is a fictional character from the BBC soap opera EastEnders, played by Lorna Fitzgerald. She was introduced by executive producer Kate Harwood on 3 July 2006 as an extension to the Branning family, along with father Max (Jake Wood), mother Tanya Branning (Jo Joyner) and older sister Lauren Branning (Madeline Duggan/Jacqueline Jossa). Her storylines involve her friendships and relationships with Ben Mitchell (Charlie Jones/Joshua Pascoe/Harry Reid) and Jay Brown (Jamie Borthwick), her toxic friendship with Babe Smith (Annette Badland), faking a pregnancy so that Ben would not leave her for Paul Coker (Jonny Labey), being a suspect in the murder of Lucy Beale (Hetti Bywater), her affair with Lauren's fiancé, Steven Beale (Aaron Sidwell), and falling pregnant by him.

In September 2017, it was announced that Fitzgerald and Jossa had been axed by executive consultant John Yorke. Abi's exit storyline involved her and Lauren falling from the roof of The Queen Victoria public house on Christmas Day 2017, leading to Abi giving birth prematurely to daughter, also named Abi, and being confirmed brainstem dead in later episodes. Abi's final scenes aired on 19 January 2018 after her life support is withdrawn. The character's funeral took place on 16 February 2018.

For her portrayal as Abi, Fitzgerald was nominated for Best Young Actor at the 2010 Inside Soap Awards, and went on to win Best Dramatic Performance from a Young Actor or Actress at the 2012 British Soap Awards. Kate White of Inside Soap praised her portrayal of Abi, saying that Fitzgerald is the "brightest young star in soap", adding "Abi's destined for great dramatic things". A writer from the Western Mail said that Abi's relationship with Jay Brown (Jamie Borthwick) is "Walford's answer to Romeo and Juliet". However, some critics were less positive, with one saying in 2012 that the audience were "not nearly" seeing as much of the "classic characters" due to the younger cast receiving more screen time.

Storylines
Abi moves to Albert Square with her parents Max Branning (Jake Wood) and Tanya Branning (Jo Joyner), and sister Lauren Branning (Madeline Duggan), where she befriends Ben Mitchell (Charlie Jones). Abi is hit by Dean Wicks' (Matt Di Angelo) car, suffering a broken wrist, cuts and bruises, but she recovers with no long-term impairment. Abi later learns that Ben's father, Phil Mitchell's (Steve McFadden), girlfriend Stella Crawford (Sophie Thompson) is abusing him, so due to this, Abi and Ben plan to run away, but fail as they are caught by their parents. Abi then stands up to Stella and tells Ben to do the same, leading Stella to kill herself when Ben reveals the abuse. In December 2007, she chooses the name for her newborn baby brother, Oscar. Soon after, when Max's affair with his son Bradley Branning's (Charlie Clements) wife, Stacey Slater (Lacey Turner), is revealed, Max and Tanya separate and eventually divorce. Abi begins to live sporadically with each parent, frequently defending Max to Tanya and Lauren, until Max and Tanya reunite in 2009, however Abi leaves with Tanya after learning of Max's financial problems. In September 2009, Abi and Jordan Johnson (Michael-Joel David Stuart) find Jordan's mother Trina Johnson's (Sharon Duncan Brewster) body in the summerhouse at the allotments having been accidentally killed by Jordan's father, Lucas Johnson (Don Gilet).

Abi starts dating Jordan, but months later he is attacked by Ben with a spanner, leaving him in a coma. They split up, but remain friends. Abi starts to take an interest in Max's lodger Darren Miller (Charlie G. Hawkins), who is left uncomfortable when she tries to kiss him, telling her she is too young and is heartbroken when Darren proposes to Jodie Gold (Kylie Babbington). Abi forms a close friendship with her mother's fiancé Greg Jessop (Stefan Booth). She later develops a crush on Jay Brown (Jamie Borthwick), and the two begin dating. Believing Jay is only interested in Abi for sex, Max tries to split them up, but fails to do so. Jay and Abi plan to have sex several times, but on each occasion, they are unable to go through with it. At one time, Jay and Abi cuddle up as they are watching television, but Max believes they are about to have sex, so he throws Jay out and rips Abi's bridesmaid dress to Greg and Tanya's wedding. They go to buy a new one, but they have a car crash on Greg and Tanya's wedding day. They suffer minor injuries and both recover.

Despite Abi's insecurities over Jay's friendship with Lola Pearce (Danielle Harold), she and Jay remain together, and eventually Max comes to accept them as a couple. Max and Tanya continue to see each other, but when Tanya is diagnosed with cervical cancer, she keeps this to herself. Eventually, Greg and Max's fiancé Vanessa Gold (Zöe Lucker) leave Walford when the truth comes out about the affair. Abi, Ben and Lola cause trouble and Abi is arrested for stealing trainers. When Abi is mugged, Lola teaches her how to self defend. Tanya finds a pregnancy test in the bin and believes it is Abi's, before finding out about her trouble causing and calls Abi a slapper, before Lauren (now played by Jacqueline Jossa) reveals to the family that Tanya has cancer. Abi is hurt by this, but is pleased when Max and Tanya reconcile. Jay proposes to Abi and she accepts, but she is faced with a dilemma when she is offered the chance to go to Costa Rica to help with sea turtle conservation. Jay gives Abi an ultimatum, threatening to break up with her if she goes to Costa Rica but she goes regardless. When she returns several weeks later, she finds out that Jay has been involved in the murder of Heather Trott (Cheryl Fergison). Abi is upset and slams the door in his face when he tries to see her. Abi goes to visit him but when Tanya discovers they have been seeing each other, she bans Abi from speaking to him. However, they eventually reunite. Abi, along with the rest of her family, are devastated to discover that when Max was away in Manchester, he married Kirsty Branning (Kierston Wareing). Abi meets her cousin Dexter Hartman (Khali Best), not knowing they are related, and this causes Jay to be jealous until the truth of their relationship is revealed. Tanya ejects Max from the family home after discovering he loves Kirsty. Abi loses her virginity to Jay much to her parents' disappointment. Abi tries to support Lauren with her drinking problem, however, this ends badly when Lauren destroys Abi's revision notes. Abi is distraught when Tanya leaves Walford with Lauren and Oscar as Lauren goes into a rehabilitation clinic in Exeter, so Max decides to move back in with her after Kirsty confesses that she has lied about being pregnant. Abi is defensive of her father and she argues with Kirsty about it, blaming her for her family's breakdown.

While on holiday with Jay and their friends, Abi thinks she could be pregnant. Jay hopes to be a father, while Abi would prefer to have an abortion. She is not pregnant, but ends their relationship, believing that they want different things. However, they soon reconcile. Max is framed for causing a car crash that leaves Phil hospitalised. Abi and Lauren, who returns from rehabilitation, struggle to pay Max's legal costs, as well as their bills. Abi receives her exam results and discovers she has not gained the grades to go to university to become a vet, but Lauren, believing that Abi has passed the exams, throws a party, during which Abi blurts out that she blames Lauren for her poor results because she has an alcohol problem. Abi decides to continue studying, but when Max goes to prison for a while she has to take a job, and struggles to find time for her studies. However, Max is proven innocent, and returns home to support his family. In an argument between Jay and Dexter, Abi discovers that on their holiday Jay kissed a barmaid while they were arguing over the suspected pregnancy. She also finds out that Lola knew and furiously confronts her best friend. However, after a heart-to-heart with Jay, they decide to work through their issues and she fixes things with Dexter and Lola as well. She also takes in a stray dog, Tramp.

When Lauren's friend Lucy Beale (Hetti Bywater) is murdered (see Who Killed Lucy Beale?), Max supports her father Ian Beale (Adam Woodyatt) through his grief. Seeing this, Abi calls him hypocritical, before revealing that she saw him kissing Lucy days before she was killed and they were having an affair. Max urges Abi to keep it a secret, but Phil discovers the affair from Jay and tells Ian. Abi proceeds to move into her grandmother, Cora Cross' (Ann Mitchell) new flat with Lauren. She eventually forgives Max and returns home. Her final A Level results come through, and she tells everyone that she has got what she needed to get into the University of Liverpool. However, she later confides in Jay that she has been lying, as not to disappoint her family. He encourages her to go through clearing, and she gets a position doing a similar course at the University of Bolton. Jay decides to go with Abi, which Max at first is opposed to, but he comes around eventually. Ben returns from prison and reunites Jay and Phil, and Jay agrees to attend Phil's wedding to Sharon Rickman (Letitia Dean), holding off on going to Bolton. At the wedding, Phil's aunt, Sal (Anna Karen), comments that she believed Lola to be Jay's girlfriend. Ben then reveals he thinks Jay is in love with Lola, and he confesses this to Abi when she confronts him. He then ends things to stay in Walford. Devastated, she wants to leave for Bolton immediately, but when Max refuses to take her, she drives the car herself, accidentally running over Tramp, killing him; she callously declares that "things die".

After her break up with Jay, Abi becomes a much nastier and bitter person. She begins a relationship with Ben (now played by Harry Reid), which is discovered by Emma Summerhayes (Anna Acton) who informs Max of the relationship. Max demands that Abi does not see Ben any more, which Abi refuses to do. Abi later discovers that Max used Ben to sign over part of Phil's businesses to him. In February 2015, Abi is accused by Max of killing Lucy. Abi did not kill Lucy, but it is revealed that on the night Lucy died, Abi had a confrontation with Lucy about her affair with Max, which resulted in Abi slapping Lucy. After Max tells her that Tanya would like her to move to Devon with her, Abi refuses and instead moves in with Ben and his family. and Abi believes she finally has a stable home life. After she moves in, Ben reveals to her that he might still be gay and is worried he will never get over his homosexuality but Abi assures him that they will make things work. She continuously mocks Jay and accuses him of being jealous of her relationship with Ben. Jay tries to make Abi see that Ben is not interested in her, but she pretends not to care about what Jay says. Abi discovers a letter from Sharon's birth mother and Sharon says that she intends on meeting her birth father after discovering that her mother has died. When Paul Coker (Jonny Labey) arrives in Walford, Abi suspects Ben of cheating on her with Paul. She and Ben have sex, so Ben can convince her he is not gay. Following Ben's arrest for Lucy's murder, Abi tells Phil that Max assaulted Lucy to get Ben off. Despite being innocent, Max turns himself in and is formally charged while Ben is released. Stacey visits Max, who tells her that he thinks Abi killed Lucy. Stacey confronts Abi, who attacks Stacey, blaming her for her parents' split and Bradley's death, and later vents to her aunt Carol Jackson (Lindsey Coulson) that she does not think Max cares about her. Carol visits Max in prison, where he informs her that the reason he thinks Abi killed Lucy is because she attacked and beat her on the night of the murder. After confronting Abi on this, Carol agrees that she has been out of control lately and advises her to call Tanya for moral support. During the phone call, Abi finds out that not only is Oscar ill, but Cora had apparently not stayed with Tanya at her house as she had earlier said. Abi, Carol and Jane Beale (Laurie Brett) find Cora living rough and bring her home. She reveals she saw Max and Abi cleaning the car lot after Lucy was killed, forcing Abi to admit that Max and Lucy had argued there and she was helping Max clean Lucy's blood. Abi then gives a statement to the police. Max is later found guilty of the murder.

Ben and Abi continue their relationship, but Ben is still secretly seeing Paul. Babe Smith (Annette Badland) offers Abi work in the pub kitchen, and Abi tells Babe that she is able to turn a blind eye to Ben's homosexuality as long as he loves her. However, when Abi finds a present that Ben has got for Paul, she realises he has feelings for Paul and confides in Babe, who helps her to publicly announce that she is pregnant. Ben asks Abi to have a termination but then changes his mind, saying he wants the baby. Abi then goes to Babe, panicking because she has lied and is not really pregnant. When Ben accompanies her to a doctor's appointment, she gets him out of the room and confesses her lie to the doctor, who encourages her to be honest, but she then tells Ben the baby is due in October. Abi plans to get pregnant by Ben, but when he admits he may have caught an STI from a stranger, she is unable to have sex with him, so Babe tells her to get pregnant by another man. Babe forces her into getting drunk, and after a drunk Lee Carter (Danny-Boy Hatchard) compliments her, they have unprotected sex. However, Abi does not get pregnant. She decides to tell Ben the truth, but as she is about to do so, he tells her he has caught chlamydia. Abi later tests positive for chlamydia and realises that Lee may have caught it too. Abi panics to Babe that Ben will discover she is not pregnant, so during an argument between Ben and Phil, Babe pushes Abi into Ben as he is pushed by Phil, knocking her to the ground. Babe takes Abi away from the square, and on their return, Abi tells Ben she has had a miscarriage. When she later sees Ben being comforted by Paul, she feels uneasy.

Abi and Babe discover that Ben's half-sister Louise Mitchell (Tilly Keeper) has been using Phil's credit card, so they force her to return everything she has bought. Babe asks Abi for a favour, but Abi realises that Babe has already assumed that she would say yes, so calls Babe a user. As revenge, Babe sends Ben a letter, telling him of the fake pregnancy. Louise finds the letter and blackmails Abi, telling her to move away with Ben. Abi tries to persuade Ben into moving but he refuses, saying he needs to be there for alcoholic Phil, and Abi tells Louise that Ben will always believe his girlfriend over his sister. Abi tells Babe that she is worried that Ben will find out, so Babe suggests that Abi tells Ben the truth. However, Abi allows Louise to continue using Phil's credit card. Later, Abi catches Ben and Louise arguing and assumes it is over the letter, and she inadvertently reveals she was never pregnant, but Ben was referring to Phil's credit card. In The Vic, Ben gets drunk and kisses Abi in the toilets and starts to undress her, but then drags her into the pub in her underwear and reveals via the karaoke microphone that she made up her pregnancy. Abi is humiliated and is taken to Dot Branning's (June Brown) house by her uncle Jack Branning (Scott Maslen), however, an enraged Phil takes her away in his car, but is stopped by Jay, who insists that enough people have been hurt. When Bobby Beale (Eliot Carrington) confesses to killing Lucy, Max is released, but refuses to see Abi or Lauren.

Abi gets her job back at The Queen Vic and celebrates with Lauren and Whitney Dean (Shona McGarty), Lee's pregnant fiancée. Abi drunkenly confesses to Lauren about her one-night stand with Lee, so she urges Abi to confess to Whitney, as Whitney has caught chlamydia from Lee. Abi does so but this results in much resentment. Babe emotionally blackmails Abi, forcing her to resign. Abi exposes Babe's secrets to the pub's landlord, Mick Carter (Danny Dyer) with Whitney defending her, so he tells Abi that she can keep her job, but this causes tension when she is later threatened by Babe. However, Abi struggles to work on her own and so Linda Carter (Kellie Bright) is forced to ask Babe back to help her. Abi then persistently bickers about an order and lack of hygiene so blames it on Babe. Angry with Abi's behaviour, Linda sacks her. Abi locks Babe in the kitchen freezer room as an act of revenge, although Babe frames her sister Sylvie Carter (Linda Marlowe) who she strongly dislikes and has Alzheimer's disease. Abi is then reinstated at the Vic by a seemingly apologetic Babe but her behaviour, when alone in the kitchen with Abi, is threatening. Babe later leaves Walford after being thrown out by her family, so Abi runs the kitchen alone. Abi forms a friendship with Donna Yates (Lisa Hammond) when she moves in with Ben and Jay, and Donna convinces Abi to move in as well, though she feels bad about leaving Dot on her own, but Dot gives her blessing when Donna reveals that Abi wants to move out. Abi is inwardly resentful of Lauren's success and, following Lauren's secret abortion of which Abi was made aware, Abi tells Lauren's boyfriend, Steven Beale (Aaron Sidwell) that they would make a good couple during a heart-to-heart, but he tells her she is too young to be a mother. On Father's Day, feeling second best to Lauren and wound up during an argument with Steven, Abi reveals the abortion. At Abi's 21st birthday party, Lauren is jealous when her boss, Josh Hemmings (Eddie Eyre), flirts with Abi, which leads to an argument, with Abi throwing a drink over her sister and then evicting her from the party. Later, the tension simmering between Abi and Steven leads to them having sex, even though he warns her it will mean nothing. Abi and Steven continue an affair and Abi learns that Steven is lying about having a brain tumour so that Lauren will not leave him. Despite being against the idea, Abi does not tell Lauren as Steven promises Abi he is planning to leave Lauren to be with her. Then Abi is stunned by Steven's public marriage proposal to Lauren. Jane overhears Abi and Steven talking about their relationship and confronts them. Abi then discovers she is pregnant by Steven. Abi helps Steven keep up the lie by giving him a brain scan from a dog and animal medication that will give him symptoms of an illness, and helping to keep Lauren away from doctor's appointments that Steven has invented.

Abi discovers that Ian's restaurant is on fire and goes inside. She finds Jane on the floor struggling to breathe. A pipe falls onto Abi, knocking her unconscious, but Max and Steven soon find her and drag her out. She is taken to hospital with Lauren by her side in the ambulance. At the hospital Abi tells Steven he is going to be a father. Steven declares his love for her and makes a promise that he will make their relationship work. Steven then dies from injuries inflicted by Max during the fire, leaving an unaware Abi devastated. In an attempt to console Lauren but also partly out of jealousy that Lauren is getting all the attention, Abi tries to tell Lauren about her pregnancy, but Lauren angrily mistakes this as gloating about her own abortion. Upset at the accusation, Abi says that she wishes Lauren died instead and that she never deserved Steven. Steven's tumour lie is revealed, so Abi attends Steven's funeral as sole mourner and declares her love. Unable to cope with Steven's death, Abi decides to leave Walford to visit Tanya in Devon, taking Steven's ashes with her. When Lauren finds out that Abi is leaving, she asks if she and Louie can come with her. Abi agrees and they leave Walford together. When they both return to Walford, Abi is fired from her job at the vets when they have CCTV evidence of her stealing medication. She asks Mick to extend her working hours at The Queen Vic, but he makes her redundant as they need to save money. Lauren eventually learns the truth about Abi and Steven's affair when she catches Abi wearing her wedding dress. Lauren finds out that Abi has Steven's ashes, and she takes his ashes to be flushed down the toilet. When Abi tries to stop her, the ashes scatter everywhere. Lauren is later disgusted to learn that Abi is pregnant with Steven's baby. However, Lauren becomes more supportive. Ian talks to Abi about expanding his restaurant business into franchises, saying he can pass it onto Abi's nephew Louie Beale, so Abi tells Ian that he will have another grandchild as she is carrying Steven's baby, but Ian says Steven was not his son and then tells Max that Abi is pregnant.

Abi goes away and on her return is confused when people are showing hatred towards Max, unaware that he was involved in a plan to redevelop Albert Square, including turning business into luxury flats and evicting people from their homes and places of work. Abi and Lauren discover that Max knows Abi is pregnant; Lauren disowns him while Abi tries to offer support, but he insults her. However, when Max tries to bake a cake for Oscar, he gets Abi to help him and they make amends. However, it is revealed that Max caused Matthew Mitchell Cotton, Jack's stepson, to be taken away from Jack. Abi turns on her father once more but when he gives her a thoughtful present for Christmas, she agrees to have Christmas dinner with him. On Christmas Day, Tanya returns to take Lauren and Abi away from Walford, revealing that Max killed Steven and tried to kill Jane. Lauren and Abi reject Max. Max goes to the roof of The Queen Vic, planning to jump, so Lauren and Abi climb on to the ledge to try and stop him. As Max agrees to his daughter's pleas to not jump, Lauren slips on the wet surface and Abi grabs her hand to stop her falling; both sisters fall off to the ground. Still alive, they are taken to hospital, where an ultrasound shows Abi's baby is alive. Abi has a CT scan and Lauren has surgery. Lauren recovers but Dr. Harding (Nick Waring) tells Max that Abi is brainstem dead and has no chance of regaining consciousness. Abi's baby is delivered via cesarean section. Max is hopeful that Abi will recover and does not tell Lauren the truth, but she slaps Max when she finds out. Max obtains a court order to stop Abi's life support being withdrawn and plans to take her to the US for a treatment that will cost £2,000,000, but Harding urges Max to do the dignified thing for Abi as she is already dead and as Abi is not a minor, he has no legal right to take her. Max barricades himself in Abi's hospital room, but is talked into letting the hospital staff in when a nurse tells Max about her own son's death and that she never got to say goodbye. When Dr. Harding explains what will happen to Max and Lauren, Max asks if the life support can be withdrawn at Abi's time of birth, 8.32pm. Tanya, Cora and her aunt Rainie Cross (Tanya Franks) return but Cora tells Max that Tanya does not want him present when the life support is withdrawn. Max finds Tanya in the hospital's chapel and she is angry with Max that Abi has to die because of him. However, just before Abi's life support is withdrawn, Tanya requests Max to be there. Abi then dies, leaving her family devastated. Following her funeral, Abi is toasted in The Queen Vic and her friends let off white balloons, while Max names her baby Abi Branning, in her memory.

Character creation and development

Introduction and characterisation

Abi was introduced into the series in 2006, by executive producer Kate Harwood. The character and her casting was announced on 25 May 2006. She and her immediate family, father Max (Wood), mother Tanya (Joyner) and older sister Lauren (Duggan, recast to Jossa in 2010), are an extension of the Branning family, who have appeared in EastEnders since 1993. Fitzgerald, in her first major television role, began filming for the soap in May 2006 and made her first on-screen appearance in July. Fitzgerald's mother commented on her daughter's casting: "Personally, I feel I want to show how proud we are of her and to thank everyone who has prayed for her and helped her in any way. At first, it is just the look they go for. Then it is more intensive and she had to read from a script. By the second audition, she was still up against 60 or 70 people. You start thinking about it when she gets to the third audition, but when the agent rang up and said she had got the part it was an overwhelming feeling. You don't know what it means until that point". Fitzgerald was offered the part about three months after her final audition. As Fitzgerald was only 10 years old when she got the part, she was required to balance her filming requirements with schooling in Northampton, and learning lines. In 2012, she told Inside Soap that she thought she had messed up her audition, and did not realise how big the show was until she was older. In 2014, she told BBC Radio 1 that when she met Wood and Joyner, her on-screen parents, she realised it did not matter that she had messed up her lines in her last audition, because she looked like them both. Fitzgerald was required to cry on her first day of filming, and admitted in 2014 that this was embarrassing, and she was unable to produce tears, but was "just making noises". Fitzgerald was chaperoned by her mother until she was 16.

Abi has been described by the official EastEnders website as the family's "golden girl" compared to Lauren, hinting that she knows how to get her own way. She has been described as "bubbly" and "self-assured" with a nose for mischief. She has also been described as having the biggest heart in Walford, bringing out the best in the people around her. Jane Simon of the Daily Mirror said that Abi is a "real soft touch". Jon Wise from The People said that after Abi received a makeover in 2010, she "actually turned out to be quite pretty". In 2012, Fitzgerald told Inside Soap Laura-Jane Tyler that Abi has grown up in her first six years on screen, and is now sensible, "like a mother hen" and has had to mature quickly because of the dramatic situations she has been involved in. Tyler added that Abi is the most level-headed and sensible member of the Branning family and "puts her [family] to shame with her mature approach to [their problems]."

Early development
Abi's earlier storylines consist of her parents fighting for custody of her and her siblings, being injured in a collision with Deano Wicks' (Di Angelo) car and helping her friend Ben (Jones) with his abuse from stepmother Stella Crawford (Thompson) In February 2011, Abi was involved in a car accident with Max and would suffer severe injuries after their car collides with a lorry on the way to Tanya's wedding to her new partner Greg (Booth). The crash scenes were filmed on 6 March 2011 and aired on 14 April 2011. After these minor storylines, Joyner said that Fitzgerald should be involved in more complex storylines in 2012. She said, "I think it's going to be an exciting year for Lorna. She's been a natural on the show ever since she was younger, and I think she's one of our best actresses. What's lovely about this year is that she'll be doing her GCSEs, and then once that's out of the way, she can get something that's a bit heavier and a bit bigger. She'll be old enough to work longer hours, so I think they'd be mad if they didn't give her something to sink her teeth into at some point this year".

In November 2010, after sister Lauren was recast to Jossa, Jossa stated that she enjoys working with Fitzgerald, adding the two have a lot in common. Jossa, in 2012, wanted Lauren and Abi to bond more. She commented: "I think realistically they would when they're going through a family problem like this. It would bring the family a little bit closer. I think they are quite close already and they have a lot of family banter! They may not like each other as people, but they love each other as family". In December 2012, Fitzgerald conducted her first magazine interview and spoke of a storyline where Abi comforts Lauren over a relationship break up, saying "It's nice to see the little [sister] taking care of the bigger one."

Jay Brown and Ben Mitchell

In March 2011, Abi starts a relationship with Jay (Jamie Borthwick). Borthwick admitted that he is enjoying filming Jay and Abi's relationship. Speaking of Jay and Abi's relationship, Borthwick told Inside Soap, "I think Abi and Jay are a good couple," he said. "Jay's a right one – he's already had a crack at Abi's sister Lauren and now he's going for the younger one. He's got an eye for the Branning women". Fitzgerald said that Jay and Abi are "cute together" but she cringes at Abi because she is "lovey-dovey". The couple split in 2014 and Abi begins a relationship with Ben, knowing that he is gay but dismissing this and branding it a "phase". Speaking of his role, newcomer Harry Reid stated that Ben would "manipulate" Abi in his attempts to prove that he is straight.

Departure
On 10 September 2017, it was announced that Fitzgerald had been axed from the show by executive consultant John Yorke, along with Jacqueline Jossa. A spokesperson said: "We can confirm Jacqueline and Lorna will be leaving. They have been wonderful to work with and we wish them all the best for the future." Fitzgerald's final episode was broadcast on 19 January 2018, in which the character dies. At the end of the episode, instead of the usual closing title sequence, the image, focused on Abi's face, fades to black and no theme music is played.

Reception
Fitzgerald was nominated for the "Best Young Actor" at the 2010 Inside Soap Awards for her portrayal of Abi  though lost out to Coronation Street'''s, Alex Bain, who plays Simon Barlow. Fitzgerald won the award for "Best Dramatic Performance from a Young Actor or Actress" at the 2012 British Soap Awards 2012 an award which Tony Stewart from the Daily Mirror said was "well deserved". Fitzgerald said she did not expect to win the award. In January 2012, Kate White of Inside Soap praised both Fitzgerald and her character, saying "In Fitzgerald, EastEnders has the brightest young star in soap. The rest of her family are getting all the juicy stuff right now, but Abi's destined for great dramatic things. Mark our words". Her colleague, Steven Murphy, said Inside Soap had "long admired" Fitzgerald.

Stewart said, due to Max's past events with his family, what Abi might say when Max objects to her relationship with Jay, "It won't be her setting a gerbil on him", calling her a "goody-two-shoes". A writer from the Western Mail said that the Branning/Mitchell Feud makes Abi and Jay feel like "Walford's answer to Romeo and Juliet". Two writers from the Daily Mirror mocked the storyline where Abi turns down the trip to Costa Rica. One said, "An extreme case of soap agoraphobia as brilliant Abi sensibly turns down the chance to spend eight weeks in the tropical paradise of Costa Rica. But in the tiny micro-world of EastEnders, even the three-mile odyssey from Walford to the West End is considered an epic journey. So Central America is simply out of the question" with another saying, "Abi was a little girl arranging tearful funerals for her pets. But now she's a young teenager, secretly engaged to boyfriend Jay and planning to run away together. He then gives Abi an ultimatum: him or her trip to Costa Rica. Best pass her the suncream, then". However, Abi, along with the younger members of the cast were thought to be the blame of declining ratings for the show; "In the last two months, viewers have seen lots of Lauren, Lucy Beale (Hetti Bywater), Whitney Dean (Shona McGarty), Fatboy (Ricky Norwood), Ben Jay, Abi and Anthony Moon (Matt Lapinskas) – but not nearly so much of the classic characters". Inside Soap noted that Abi and Jay's relationship was popular with viewers.

The 2016 storyline in which Abi lies that she has suffered a miscarriage to cover up a pregnancy lie was criticised by Zoe Clark-Coates, co-founder and CEO of The Mariposa Trust, who said, "To regularly see TV shows using fake miscarriages as light entertainment could make people question genuine losses." In August 2017, Fitzgerald was longlisted for "Best Bad Girl" at the 2017 Inside Soap Awards, while she and Aaron Sidwell (Steven Beale) were longlisted for "Best Partnership". Fitzgerald made the viewer-voted shortlist in the "Best Bad Girl" category, but lost out to Gillian Kearney, who portrays Emma Barton in Emmerdale. The scene where Lauren and Abi fell from the roof of The Queen Vic was awarded "Scene of the Year" at the 2018 British Soap Awards, tying with Doctors who also won the same award for "The Bollywood Proposal". Abi's death was nominated for "Most devastating Soap Death" at the 2018 Digital Spy'' Reader Awards; it came in seventh place with 6.4% of the total votes.

See also
List of EastEnders characters (2006)
List of soap opera villains
"Who Killed Lucy Beale?"

References

External links

EastEnders characters
Television characters introduced in 2006
Child characters in television
Fictional receptionists
Fictional waiting staff
Female characters in television
Female villains
Teenage characters in television
Branning family